{{safesubst:#invoke:RfD|||month = March
|day = 17
|year = 2023
|time = 12:52
|timestamp = 20230317125232

|content=
REDIRECT December 2022 Twitter suspensions

}}